Grießen may refer to:

Grießen Pass, an alpine pass in Austria
Grießen (Klettgau), a village in the municipality of Klettgau in Germany